Elachista helvola is a moth of the family Elachistidae that can be found in Australia.

References

Moths described in 2011
Endemic fauna of Australia
helvola
Moths of Australia